"Mr. Lisa's Opus" is the eighth episode of the twenty-ninth season of the American animated television series The Simpsons, and the 626th episode of the series overall. It aired in the United States on Fox on December 3, 2017. The title is a spoof of the film Mr. Holland's Opus. Lisa looks back through all her family's attempts to remember her birthday and uses those attempts to write an essay for Harvard.

Plot
7 years ago in 2010, baby Lisa wakes up Marge and Homer, upon seeing a sunrise, exclaiming "Light!", "Breakfast!" and words relating to nature. Realizing she is a genius, Homer admires how awesome she is, offending Bart, who was going to show him a drawing but instead stabs him in the leg with a pencil.

17 years later in 2027, 18-year-old Lisa is writing a Harvard College admission essay and she starts reflecting on her past, while she is having to cope with 20-year-old Bart being a disappointment and still living with their parents.

Lisa begins her essay with her 7th birthday in 2016, showing how she accidentally destroyed her favorite blue dress and switched to red, and how Marge inadvertently got Maggie addicted to pacifiers after she could not sleep. The family and her teacher, Ms. Myles, forget her birthday, with Myles sending her to Principal Skinner after she gets sad on them celebrating Hubert Wong's birthday, but not hers. Homer comes to get her and finally remembers that it is her birthday, and coming home they find out Ned Flanders did not forget and gifts her a tricycle. The family celebrates her birthday with a bowl of cereal and milk, with some candles on it.

Next, Lisa shows how Homer and Marge's marriage nearly fell apart on her 14th birthday in 2024. The family this time remembers, and even brings Leon Kompowsky to sing new verses for "Happy Birthday, Lisa" while Homer brings a cake with "Happy twelfth twelfth 12th birthday", which he is disappointed with when an amused Lisa corrects him. After Lisa returns home from school, she places some of her gifts from school in Marge's closet, only to discover an unopened letter for Homer in a suitcase, where Marge says she is leaving him and opening a bed and breakfast with the other kids.

At dinner, Marge gets angry at Homer for drinking in front of the kids, and tells him to go to Moe's Tavern to drink. Marge goes to the kitchen to cry and Lisa is ready to take action. At the tavern, Lisa warns Homer that Marge is going to leave him and makes him promise to quit drinking, as she does not want him to ruin the last memories of the next four years of them together. Homer calls his sponsor, Ned, to help him quit. He succeeds and the marriage is saved.

Lisa sends her essay into Harvard, who note that the essay is not all great, but admit her in anyway due to her stellar grades and extracurricular activities, making her the first student from her state. They send in a drone to Lisa with her acceptance. Other drones from other prestigious universities appear (Massachusetts Institute of Technology, McGill University, Oberlin College, Tufts University, Boston College) but the Harvard one destroys the others.

Lisa goes to college and sets up her room, but is not happy in her first day, especially when one of her new roommates makes her feel inferior. While taking a walk outside college, Bart cheers her up, telling her that she has better prospects for her future and urging her to make their parents proud. As he then leaves with the rest of the family, Lisa watches as Maggie holds up an encouraging sign for her "YOU SPEAK FOR ME!". As she heads back into her new room, preparing for the new life, she also meets a second roommate, who is sulking at not being good enough in her own life. Lisa comforts her and they both find they have a lot in common. Lisa finds that this new friend will make her life in college better, since she will have someone to talk to throughout her journey, with something more hinted between them.

Lisa narrates in a voiceover that after looking back on her past, she never doubted that who she is was good enough. A collage of scenes through her life is then shown, returning to the first scene of 1-year-old Lisa exclaiming "Light!", as Homer admires her as the most amazing thing he did. After she describes his happy and euphoric mood, he takes her down to the piano with Marge, as the couple sings a new version of "Those Were the Days" from All in the Family to her, Lisa joining in with them during the last line. Norman Lear enters the house telling Homer and Marge that he will see them in court.

A final tour of Springfield is shown during the credits which plays the closing theme to All In the Family with the Duff Blimp saying "Stay tuned for Simpson and Son".

Reception
Dennis Perkins of The A.V. Club gave the episode a C, stating "Jean's script sends us chasing these different-aged Lisas through the years to no real purpose or effect. There are a few sweet moments that stand out more for their abrupt humanity in the face of the gimmickry as much as their emotional impact."

Tony Sokol of Den of Geek gave the episode 4.5/5 stars, saying, "'Mr. Lisa's Opus' is an epic comedy film parody, along the lines of, but funnier on a line-by-line basis than, last season's 'Barthood.' Even a short gag on an everlasting battle takes on historic relevance. The episode has its treacle, but Al Jean cuts it with brilliant subversion. Dan Castellaneta's voice of Homer is in its glory as a rapid fire laugh delivery system."

"Mr. Lisa's Opus" scored a 1.7 rating with a 6 share and was watched by 4.28 million viewers, making it Fox's highest rated show of the night.

References

External links
 

2017 American television episodes
The Simpsons (season 29) episodes
Television episodes about birthdays